Ducournau is a French surname. Notable people with the surname include:

 Gilbert Ducournau (born 1992), Venezuelan–French cyclist
 Julia Ducournau (born 1983), French film director and screenwriter

French-language surnames